Aplochiton marinus is a species of fish in the family Galaxiidae. It is an amphidromous fish migrating between ocean and fresh water.

A. marinus is endemic to Chile.  Aplochiton marinus.   2006 IUCN Red List of Threatened Species.     Downloaded on 4 August 2007.</ref> FishBase lists A. marinus as a synonym of A. taeniatus (also reported in Argentina), but IUCN treats it as a distinct species of its own.

References

Aplochiton
Freshwater fish of Chile
Taxonomy articles created by Polbot
Fish described in 1928
Endemic fauna of Chile